Jason Matthew Smith (born November 2, 1973) is a Canadian former professional ice hockey defenceman who played in over 1,000 regular season games in the National Hockey League (NHL) from 1993 to 2009. Smith played for the New Jersey Devils, Toronto Maple Leafs, Edmonton Oilers, Philadelphia Flyers and Ottawa Senators, having been originally selected by New Jersey in the first round, 18th overall, at the 1992 NHL Entry Draft. Smith served as team captain of both the Edmonton Oilers and Philadelphia Flyers, the former of which he led for five years and guided to the 2006 Stanley Cup Finals.

Smith was also the head coach for the Western Hockey League's Kelowna Rockets from 2016 to 2018.

Playing career

Amateur
Smith was drafted in the first round, 18th overall, of the 1992 NHL Entry Draft by the New Jersey Devils. As a member of the Western Hockey League (WHL)'s Regina Pats, he was named to the WHL's All-Rookie Team for the 1991–92 season and the WHL First All-Star Team in 1992–93, also winning the Bill Hunter Trophy as the WHL's top defenceman in the latter season. Internationally, Smith was also a member of the gold medal-winning Canadian junior team at the World Junior Ice Hockey Championship in 1993 in Sweden, a roster also including future NHL stars Chris Pronger, Adrian Aucoin, Paul Kariya, Manny Legace and Martin Lapointe.

Professional
Smith made his NHL debut with the Devils during the 1993–94 season, though he spent the majority of the season in the American Hockey League (AHL) with the team's affiliate, the Albany River Rats. He then missed the majority of the 1994–95 season due to a knee injury, but recovered in time to play in one Stanley Cup playoff game, his playoff debut, before eventually returning to captain the River Rats to a Calder Cup championship in 1995, the same year the Devils captured their first Stanley Cup. Then next season, 1995–96, Smith became a regular fixture on New Jersey's NHL roster.

On February 25, 1997, during the 1996–97 season, Smith was involved in a blockbuster trade, moving to the Toronto Maple Leafs, along with Steve Sullivan and the rights to Alyn McCauley, in exchange for Doug Gilmour, Dave Ellett and New Jersey's fourth-round draft pick in 1999 (which Toronto had acquired in the Dave Andreychuk trade the year before.)

Smith spent parts of three seasons in Toronto before being traded to the Edmonton Oilers on March 3, 1999, during the 1998–99 season. When the Oilers' team captain Doug Weight was later traded to the St. Louis Blues, Smith's strong leadership tendencies resulted in his being handed the captaincy, where he would ultimately match Wayne Gretzky as the longest-serving captain in Oilers history at five seasons, wearing the "C" from 2001 to 2007, excluding the 2004–05 NHL lock-out in which the 2004–05 season was cancelled.

Smith captained the Oilers to a largely unexpected run to the 2006 Stanley Cup Finals, in which they faced the Carolina Hurricanes, another dark horse team. However, the Oilers lost in the Final game of a gruelling seven-game series. He contributed one goal and four assists during Edmonton's surprise playoff run.

On July 1, 2007, Edmonton General Manager Kevin Lowe traded Smith, along with forward Joffrey Lupul, to the Philadelphia Flyers in exchange for Joni Pitkänen, Geoff Sanderson and Philadelphia's third-round draft pick in 2009.

In his first and only season in Philadelphia, Smith captained a rebuilt Flyers squad to an Eastern Conference showdown against their inter-state rivals, the Pittsburgh Penguins. Despite the fact that the Penguins won the series, the Flyers' turnaround from the worst team in the NHL to their status in 2007–08 was a testament to Smith's leadership abilities.

In the 2008–09 season, Smith played his last year in the NHL with the Ottawa Senators before retiring from professional hockey on September 2, 2009. He later became an assistant coach for the Senators.

Career statistics

Regular season and playoffs

International

Awards
 WHL East First All-Star Team – 1993

Transactions
 February 25, 1997 – Traded by New Jersey, along with Steve Sullivan and the rights to Alyn McCauley, to Toronto in exchange for Dave Ellett, Doug Gilmour and a third-round draft pick;
 March 3, 1999 – Traded by Toronto to Edmonton in exchange for a fourth-round pick in the 1999 NHL Entry Draft and a second-round pick in the 2000 NHL Entry Draft;
 July 1, 2007 – Traded by Edmonton, along with Joffrey Lupul, to Philadelphia in exchange for Joni Pitkänen, Geoff Sanderson and a third-round pick in the 2009 NHL Entry Draft;
 July 8, 2008 – Signed as an unrestricted free agent by Ottawa;
 September 2, 2009 – Retired from the NHL.

See also
List of NHL players with 1000 games played

References

External links
 

1973 births
Living people
Albany River Rats players
Bellingham Ice Hawks players
Calgary Canucks players
Canadian expatriate ice hockey players in the United States
Canadian ice hockey coaches
Canadian ice hockey defencemen
Edmonton Oilers players
Kelowna Rockets coaches
Merritt Centennials players
National Hockey League first-round draft picks
New Jersey Devils draft picks
New Jersey Devils players
Ottawa Senators coaches
Ottawa Senators players
Ottawa Senators scouts
Philadelphia Flyers captains
Philadelphia Flyers players
Regina Pats players
Ice hockey people from Calgary
Toronto Maple Leafs players
Utica Devils players